Harstad is a town in Harstad Municipality in Troms og Finnmark county, Norway. The town is also the administrative centre of the municipality of Harstad. It is the second-largest town in the former Troms county, after the city of Tromsø, and it is the largest town in Central Hålogaland.

The town is located on the northeastern part of the large island of Hinnøya, along the Vågsfjorden.  The town is made up of several areas including Gangsås, Grønnebakkan, Kanebogen, Medkila, Sama, Seljestad, and Stangnes.   There are two churches of the Church of Norway in the town: Harstad Church and Kanebogen Church.  The historic Trondenes Church lies just north of the town.

History
On 1 January 1904, the village of Harstad was granted town privileges as a ladested.  On the same date, the new town was separated from the municipality of Trondenes to become a municipality of its own.  Initially, the town of Harstad had 1,246 residents.  The town of Harstad existed as its own municipality between 1 January 1904 until 31 December 1963.

During the 1960s, there were many municipal mergers across Norway due to the work of the Schei Committee. On 1 January 1964, the town of Harstad (population: 3,808) was merged with Trondenes municipality (population: 6,567) to the north and Sandtorg municipality (population: 7,512) to the south, forming a new, much larger Harstad Municipality.

Media gallery

References

Harstad
Cities and towns in Norway
Former municipalities of Norway
Port cities and towns in Norway
1904 establishments in Norway
Populated places established in 1904